Huayu is an alternative name of Standard Chinese, used in parts of Southeast Asia.

Huayu may also refer to:
Huayu, Shanxi, a town in Jishan County, Shanxi, China
Huayu, Shandong, a town in Jinxiang County, Shandong, China
Singaporean Mandarin, a variety of Mandarin Chinese widely spoken in Singapore

See also
Hua Yu (disambiguation)